John Joseph Delaney (August 21, 1878 – November 18, 1948) was an American lawyer and politician who served ten terms as a United States representative from New York from 1918 to 1919, and then from 1931 to 1948. He was elected to an 11th term in 1948 but died shortly after the election.

Early life and career 
Delaney was born in Brooklyn, he attended St. Ann's Parochial School and St. James' Academy in Brooklyn and Manhattan College. He engaged in the diamond business in 1897, was graduated from the Brooklyn Law School of St. Lawrence University in 1914, was admitted to the bar in 1915 and commenced practice in New York City.

First term in Congress 
Delaney was elected as a Democrat to the Sixty-fifth Congress, by special election, to fill the vacancy caused by the resignation of Representative John J. Fitzgerald, and held office from March 5, 1918 to March 3, 1919.

New York public official 
He declined to be a candidate for renomination in 1918 and resumed his former business pursuits. He was a delegate to the Democratic State conventions in 1922 and 1924 and was deputy Commissioner of Public Markets of New York City from 1924 to 1931.

Return to Congress 
He was again elected as a Democrat to the House of Representatives, this time to the Seventy-second Congress, to fill the vacancy caused by the death of Representative-elect Matthew V. O'Malley.

Death 
Delaney was reelected to the eight succeeding Congresses, holding office from November 3, 1931 to November 18, 1948. He was reelected in 1948 to the Eighty-first Congress but died on November 18, 1948, in Brooklyn.

Interment was in Holy Cross Cemetery.

See also
 List of United States Congress members who died in office (1900–49)

References

1878 births
1948 deaths
Politicians from Brooklyn
Manhattan College alumni
Brooklyn Law School alumni
Commissioners of Public Markets
Democratic Party members of the United States House of Representatives from New York (state)